Ludwig Barnay (1842 – February 1924) was a German stage actor.

Biography
He was born Ludwig (Lajos) Braun  at Pest. His father was the secretary general for the local Jewish Community, Ignac Barnay (until 1844: Braun). He made his debut in 1860 at Trutenau and appeared in Pest the following year, after which he had engagements of varying length in Graz, Mainz, Vienna, Prague, Riga, Mainz again, Leipzig, and Weimar.

From 1870 to 1875 he was at the Stadt Theater of Frankfort-on-the-Main, and for the next five years at that of Hamburg, where he acted as director. Several years after that, he traveled as a "star," visiting London in 1881 with the Meiningen Court Company, and in 1882 making a successful tour of the United States. From 1887 to 1894 he managed his Berliner Theater in Berlin, following which he made his home in Wiesbaden.

Barnay's greatest talents were shown in tragedy. He excelled in roles such as Essex, Uriel Acosta, Othello, Antony, Tell, and Egmont. He was the leader in the movement which assembled the stage congress at Weimar in 1871, thus being founder of the "Stage Association" which proved of such value to the German theatrical profession.

In 1864 he married Marie Kreuzer, daughter of Heinrich Kreuzer, tenor at the Vienna Court Opera, and, after getting divorced in 1882, the actress Minnie Arndt.

Ludwig Barnay died in Berlin in February 1924. His memoirs contained an account of his performances, in which he calculated that he had been married on stage 1,721 times and had died 1,120 times.

References

External links 

 

1842 births
1924 deaths
German male stage actors
Hungarian Jews
Hungarian male stage actors
Hungarian expatriates in the Czech lands
Hungarian expatriates in Austria
Hungarian expatriates in Germany
Jewish German male actors
People from Pest, Hungary
Male actors from Budapest
19th-century German male actors